Saving Grace is a 1998 film produced in New Zealand based on a play by Duncan Sarkies. It was directed by Costa Botes and stars Kirsty Hamilton and Jim Moriarty.

Plot
Unemployed teenager Grace Cuthberston meets the mysterious Gerald Hutchinson; the  two eventually become lovers.  Gerald then claims to be Christ, and Grace has to determine whether he is mad and if there is a reason for the coincidences and "miracles" that seem to be happening.

References

External links

1998 films
New Zealand drama films
1990s English-language films